Sarah van Berkel (née Meier) (born 4 May 1984) is a Swiss former figure skater. She is the 2011 European champion, a two-time European silver medalist (2007 & 2008), the 2006 Grand Prix Final bronze medalist, and an eight-time Swiss national champion (2000–2001, 2003, 2005–2008, 2010).

Personal life 
Meier was born on 4 May 1984 in Bülach, Switzerland. Many members of her family were involved in skating and other ice sports. Her mother has served as an international figure skating judge and her sister has participated in synchronized skating. Her aunt, Eva Fehr, a former figure skater, was her coach. Her father, uncle, and two cousins have played ice hockey.

On 3 August 2018, Meier married Swiss triathlete Jan van Berkel.

Career

Early career
Meier first stepped on the ice at the age of two years. She liked it so much that her mother sent her to children's courses at the age of four. When Meier was five years old she began taking private lessons and soon started to compete. She landed her first double Axel at the age of ten and performed her first triple Lutz when she was twelve. By the age of thirteen, she could land all of the triple jumps in practice. During the summers, there was no ice in her home town of Bulach so she moved around to Oberstdorf, Germany, and Flims in Switzerland.

Meier made her first junior Grand Prix appearance in 1997, finishing 10th at JGP Slovakia. She continued to skate primarily in the junior ranks through the 1999–2000 season and won the bronze medal at the 2000 World Junior Championships in Oberstdorf.

2000–2001 season
Meier began her season competing at junior events; she won medals at two JGP events, including gold in the Czech Republic. She then finished 5th at the 2001 European Championships in Bratislava, Slovakia, and 12th at the 2001 World Championships in Vancouver, Canada.

2001–2002 season
In November 2001, Meier twisted her left ankle and tore ligaments, resulting in the loss of three months of training. As a result, she missed her second Grand Prix event and the Swiss Championships. She finished 13th at the 2002 European Championships in Lausanne, Switzerland, and at the 2002 Winter Olympics in Salt Lake City, Utah.

2002–2003 season
Meier finished 5th and 7th at her two Grand Prix assignments. She withdrew from the 2003 European Championships due to a foot injury, and finished 19th at the 2003 World Championships in Washington, D.C.

2003–2004 season
Before the start of the season, Meier developed tendonitis in her right foot due to new boots and was unable to train from July to December. Making her return to competition, she placed 10th at the 2004 European Championships in Budapest, Hungary, and then 13th at the 2004 World Championships in Dortmund, Germany.

2004–2005 season
Meier repeated her tenth place showing at the 2005 European Championships in Turin, Italy, and finished 14th at the 2005 World Championships in Moscow, Russia.

2005–2006 season
Meier placed fourth at the 2006 European Championships in Lyon, France; it was the best continental result of her career to that point. She finished 8th at the 2006 Winter Olympics in Turin, Italy, and then 6th at the 2006 World Championships in Calgary, Canada.

2006–2007 season
Meier began her Grand Prix season with a fourth-place result at the 2006 Skate America in October. In November, she outscored Hungary's Júlia Sebestyén by 12 points to win the gold medal at the 2006 Cup of Russia. As a result, she qualified to the Grand Prix Final, where she took the bronze medal.

In January, Meier won silver at the 2007 European Championships in Warsaw, Poland. It was the first European podium finish for a Swiss woman since Denise Biellmann won gold in 1981.

2007–2008 season
Meier placed fourth at the 2007 Trophee Eric Bompard and won silver at the 2007 NHK Trophy, finishing 1.52 points shy of the champion, Carolina Kostner. In January, she won another silver medal, at the 2008 European Championships in Zagreb, Croatia. She placed 6th at the 2008 World Championships in Gothenburg, Sweden.

2008–2009 season
Meier competed in few events in her final three seasons due to a string of injuries. She missed much of 2008–2009 due to spinal disc herniation and muscle problems, although she was able to compete at the 2009 World Championships and earned an Olympic spot for Switzerland with her ninth place showing.

2009–2010 season
During the season, Meier struggled with an Achilles tendon inflammation. She withdrew from the 2009 NHK Trophy because she was unable to put too much pressure on her toe pick. She finished 5th at the 2010 European Championships in Tallinn, Estonia, and then 15th at the 2010 Winter Olympics in Vancouver, Canada. After a bad fall in the short program, she failed to qualify for the free skate at the 2010 World Championships in Turin, Italy.

The many injuries Meier had suffered during the latter part of her career led her to consider retirement after the 2009–2010 season, but she eventually decided to remain in the eligible ranks for one last season, mainly in order to compete in her home country at the 2011 Europeans in Bern.

2010–2011 season
Meier damaged ligaments in her foot at the 2010 Skate Canada, forcing her to withdraw from the event. The injury occurred on her favorite jump, the Lutz, denting her confidence. Forced to sit out the Grand Prix season and Swiss Championships, Meier announced prior to the 2011 European Championships in Bern that it would be her final competitive event. She ranked third in the short program and second in the free skate, but her combined score was high enough to become the European champion. She reaffirmed her decision to retire immediately following her win, calling it "the right moment to stop... the perfect ending."

Post-competitive career
In May 2011, Meier announced that she would join Switzerland's "Art on Ice" Production as an executive for its talent team, responsible for talent scouting, looking after members of the team and working with parents, teachers, schools, team experts and Swiss Ice Skating. She is also involved in finding sponsors for Swiss skating.

Meier continued to skate as a pro skater, in shows and other events. She withdrew from the 2011 Japan Open due to swelling in her foot; the ligaments had not fully healed after the 2010 Skate Canada injury. In 2013, she began working as a journalist. In February 2015, she retired from show skating at Art on Ice.

Programs

Post-2011

Pre-2011

Competitive highlights 
GP = Grand Prix; JGP = Junior Grand Prix

References

External links

 
 
 

1984 births
Living people
Swiss female single skaters
Olympic figure skaters of Switzerland
Figure skaters at the 2002 Winter Olympics
Figure skaters at the 2006 Winter Olympics
Figure skaters at the 2010 Winter Olympics
European Figure Skating Championships medalists
World Junior Figure Skating Championships medalists
People from Bülach
Competitors at the 2005 Winter Universiade
Sportspeople from the canton of Zürich